The Limo may refer to:

 "The Limo" (Seinfeld)
 "The Limo" (How I Met Your Mother)
 "The Limo" (Yes, Dear episode)

See also
 Limo (disambiguation)